Manoj Duraisingh is a British molecular parasitologist currently the  John LaPorte Given Professor of Immunology and Infectious Diseases at Harvard T.H. Chan School of Public Health.

Notes

Year of birth missing (living people)
Living people
Harvard School of Public Health faculty
American immunologists
Place of birth missing (living people)